Crappies are two species of North American freshwater fish of the genus Pomoxis in the family Centrarchidae (sunfishes).  Both species of crappies are popular game fish among recreational anglers.

Etymology 
The genus name Pomoxis literally means "sharp cover", referring to the fish's spiny gill covers (opercular bones). 

The common name (also spelled croppie or crappé) derives from the Canadian French , which refers to many different fishes of the sunfish family. Other names for crappie are papermouths, strawberry bass, speckled bass or specks (especially in Michigan), speckled perch, white perch, crappie bass,  calico bass (throughout the Middle Atlantic states and New England),  and Oswego bass.

In Louisiana, it is called sacalait, seemingly an allusion to its milky white flesh or silvery skin. The supposed French meaning is, however, folk etymology, because the word is ultimately from Choctaw , meaning "trout".

Species
The currently recognized species in this genus are:

Biology 
Both species of crappie as adults feed predominantly on smaller fish species, including the young of their own predators (which include the northern pike, muskellunge, and walleye). They have diverse diets, however, including zooplankton, insects, and crustaceans. Larval crappies rely on crustacean zooplankton as a food source. The availability of zooplankton can have an effect on larval populations. By day, crappie tend to be less active and concentrate around weed beds or submerged objects, such as logs and boulders. They feed during dawn and dusk, by moving into open water or approaching the shore.

Fishing

The Pomoxis species are highly regarded panfish and are often considered to be among the best-tasting freshwater food fish. Because of their diverse diets, crappie may be caught in many ways, including casting light jigs, trolling with minnows or soft lures, using small spinnerbaits, or using bobbers with common hookbaits. Crappies are also popular with ice anglers, as they are active in winter.

Angling

Angling for crappie is popular throughout much of North America. Methods vary, but among the most popular is called "spider rigging", a method characterized by a fisherman in a boat with many long fishing rods pointing away from the angler at various angles like spokes from a wheel (spider rigging is not permitted on some waters. In Minnesota, for example, a fisherman may use only one rod  during the open water season). Anglers who employ the spider rigging method may choose from among many popular baits, some of the most popular are plastic jigs with lead jigheads, crankbaits or live minnows. Many anglers also chum or dump live groundbait into the water to attract the fish to bite their bait. Crappies are also regularly targeted and caught during the spawning period by fly fishermen, and can be taken from frozen ponds and lakes in winter by ice fishing.

Commercial fishing
Before state fisheries departments began to implement more restrictive, conservation-minded regulations, a great number of crappies, especially in the Mississippi River states, were harvested commercially in the 19th and early 20th centuries.

A commercial fishery for crappies existed at Reelfoot Lake in Tennessee until 2003. It was one of the few commercial fisheries for crappies in recent decades.

Fishing records
According to International Game Fish Association, the most outstanding records are:

 Black crappie: , caught by Lionel "Jam" Ferguson at Richeison Pond in Tennessee on May 15, 2018
 White crappie: , caught by Fred Brigh in Water Valley, Mississippi on July 31, 1957

References

Further reading
 
 

 
Nelson, Gary; Martin, Richard; Sutton, Keith (1991). Panfishing. Minneapolis, MN: North American Fishing Club. .

Centrarchinae
Freshwater fish of the United States
Taxa named by Constantine Samuel Rafinesque
Fauna of the Eastern United States
Extant Miocene first appearances